Hukeng may refer to the following locations in China:

 Hukeng, Fujian (湖坑镇), town in Yongding County
 Hukeng, Jiangxi (浒坑镇), town in Anfu County